The 1976 WANFL season was the 92nd season of the Western Australian National Football League in its various incarnations.

After a half-decade in which the fortunes of all WANFL clubs, with the exception of East Perth, fluctuated severely, 1975 and 1976 saw a return to more stability, with Perth establishing themselves along with East Perth and South Fremantle as the top three of the league. Claremont, six games clear on the bottom in 1975, began with seven wins from ten matches but won only once more, whilst 1975 premiers West Perth had a disastrous start with injuries but recovered in June and July to clearly re-establish themselves as one of the top bracket.

Under coach Ken Armstrong, the Demons won their first premiership since Mal Atwell's great team from 1968 – remarkably not one 1968 premiership player appeared eight years later. At the other end of the ladder, 1950s cellar dwellers Subiaco and Swan Districts returned to that position, with the Lions winning only two of their first nineteen games as they lost with no adequate replacements all but twelve of their 1973 senior players to either the VFL, retirement or, with Mick Malone, cricket commitments.

The scoring in 1976 increased to a record average score of 108.05 points per team per game beating the previous record of 101.21 from 1970, a figure to be exceeded in each of the next eleven seasons. From the eighth home-and-away round the WANFL followed the VFL in introducing a second field umpire, a move instantly regarded as a success. Another innovation, in this case five years ahead of the VFL, was playing two games on Sunday afternoons for the first time. Although rated a success, it was not repeated until 1982.

Home-and-away season

Round 1

Round 2

Round 3 (Easter weekend)

Round 4

Round 5

Round 6

Round 7

Round 8

Round 9

Round 10

Round 11

Round 12

Round 13

Round 14

Round 15

Round 16

Round 17

Round 18

Round 19

Round 20

Round 21

Ladder

Finals

First semi-final

Second semi-final

Preliminary final

Grand Final

References

External links
Official WAFL website
Western Australian National Football League (WANFL), 1976

West Australian Football League seasons
WANFL